Jack Steele (born 1932) is a Canadian former international soccer player.

References

1932 births
Living people
Association football midfielders
Canadian soccer players
Canada men's international soccer players
Soccer players from Victoria, British Columbia